William H. Seward (1801–1872) was an American politician.

William Seward may also refer to:
 William Seward (anecdotist) (1747–1799), English anecdotist
 William H. Seward Jr. (1839–1920), banker and US Civil War general
 Bill Seward, American sports broadcaster

See also